The Chlorellales are an order of green algae in the class Trebouxiophyceae.

Genera of uncertain placement:
Ankistrodesmopsis
Picochlorum

References

External links

 
Chlorophyta orders